Jaroslav Cihlář (7 April 1924 – 2 May 2014) was a Czech cyclist. He competed in three events at the 1956 Summer Olympics.

References

External links
 

1924 births
2014 deaths
Czech male cyclists
Olympic cyclists of Czechoslovakia
Cyclists at the 1956 Summer Olympics
Sportspeople from Prague